The seventh season of Chicago P.D., an American police drama television series with executive producer Dick Wolf, and producers Derek Haas, Michael Brandt, and Rick Eid, was ordered on February 26, 2019. The season premiered on September 25, 2019. On March 13, 2020, the production of the seventh season was suspended due to the COVID-19 pandemic.

Cast

Regular cast members
 Jason Beghe as Sergeant Henry "Hank" Voight
 Jesse Lee Soffer as Detective Jay Halstead
 Tracy Spiridakos as Detective Hailey Upton
 Marina Squerciati as Officer Kim Burgess
 Patrick John Flueger as Officer Adam Ruzek
 LaRoyce Hawkins as Officer Kevin Atwater
 Lisseth Chavez as Officer Vanessa Rojas (Episode 4 onwards, Guest Episodes 2–3)
 Amy Morton as Desk Sergeant Trudy Platt

Recurring characters
 Paul Adelstein as Interim Superintendent Jason Crawford
 Michael Beach as Darius Walker

Special guest stars
 Anne Heche as Deputy Superintendent Katherine Brennan
 Brian Geraghty as Sean Roman

Special co-stars
 Ricky Bartlett as Security Guard 1

Crossover characters
 Jesse Spencer as Captain Matt Casey 
 Taylor Kinney as Lieutenant Kelly Severide
 Kara Killmer as Paramedic in charge Sylvie Brett
 David Eigenberg as Lieutenant Christopher Hermann
 Joe Minoso as Firefighter Joe Cruz 
 Christian Stolte as Firefighter Randy "Mouch" McHolland 
 Miranda Rae Mayo as Firefighter Stella Kidd
 Annie Ilonzeh as Paramedic Emily Foster 
 Eamonn Walker as Battalion Chief Wallace Boden 
 Alberto Rosende as Firefighter Blake Gallo
 Randy Flagler as Firefighter Harold Capp
 Anthony Ferraris as Firefighter Tony
 Nick Gehlfuss as Dr. Will Halstead
 Yaya DaCosta as April Sexton
 Torrey DeVitto as Dr. Natalie Manning 
 Dominic Rains as Dr. Crockett Marcel
 S. Epatha Merkerson as Sharon Goodwin
 Jeremy Shouldis as Doctor Marty Peterson
 Daniel Kyri as Firefighter Darren Ritter
 Eileen Galindo as Mama Garcia

Episodes

Production
Actor Jon Seda, who plays Antonio Dawson, departed the series at the end of the sixth season due to creative reasons. In July 2019, Lisseth Chavez joined the cast in the recurring role of Vanessa Rojas, an undercover officer.

Ratings

References

External links

2019 American television seasons
2020 American television seasons
Television productions suspended due to the COVID-19 pandemic
Chicago P.D. (TV series) seasons